Andrée Dupont-Roc is a French curler and curling coach.

She participated in the demonstration curling events at the 1988 Winter Olympics, where the French women's team finished in eighth place.

At the national level, she is a French women's champion curler (1997).

Teams

Women's

Mixed

Record as a coach of national teams

References

External links

Living people
Sportspeople from Haute-Savoie
French female curlers
French curling champions
Curlers at the 1988 Winter Olympics
Olympic curlers of France
French curling coaches
Date of birth missing (living people)
Place of birth missing (living people)
Year of birth missing (living people)